Øjvind Moestrup (born 15 December 1941) is a Danish aquatic botanist, working particularly with the classification of algae.  He worked at the Botanical Institute at the University of Copenhagen and is a professor emeritus in the Department of Biology there.  He published over 100 scientific papers.

Moestrup received his doctorate in biology from the University of Copenhagen in 1983, and has worked with the Fishery Inspection Service of the Danish Ministry of Fisheries.  His major areas of research include the taxonomy of planktonic algae, haptophytes, toxic diatoms and raphidophytes.

Honours
In 2012 Professor Moestrup received the Yasumoto Award for excellence in his lifetime dedicated work of research on the biology, taxonomy and ultrastructure of microalgae.

The following have been named after him:
 Gyrodinium moestrupii
 Moestrupia
 Ochromonas moestrupii
 Platychrysis moestrupii 
 Pyramimonas moestrupii
 Resultomonas moestrupii

References

20th-century Danish botanists
Danish phycologists
Botanists with author abbreviations
1941 births
Living people
21st-century Danish botanists